The 2018–19 FA Women's League Cup was the 8th edition of the FA Women's Super League and FA Women's Championship's league cup competition. It is sponsored by Continental AG, who have sponsored the competition since its creation, and is officially known as the FA Continental Tyres League Cup. All 22 teams of the FA Women's Super League and FA Women's Championship contest the competition - the largest field in the history of the cup.

Arsenal are the defending champions. Before the competition, only Manchester City and Arsenal had won the cup in the previous seven seasons it was contested in.

Format changes
Following the previous season's reversion to a group format in the initial stage, the 2018–19 WSL Cup will keep the same format but expand to accommodate the increase in teams in the top two divisions of women's football to 22. As a result, two of the four groups will contain six teams while the others remain at five, with only the top two going through to the quarter-finals from each.

Group stage

Group One North

Group Two North

Group One South

Group Two South

Knock-out stage

Quarter-finals

The draw for this round was made on 18 December 2018.

Semi-finals
The draw for the semi-finals was made on 12 January 2019.

Final

See also
2018–19 FA WSL
2018–19 FA Women's Championship

References

External links
Official website

FA Women's League Cup
Cup